Brougham Place Uniting Church is a church on Brougham Place, North Adelaide, South Australia. It was formerly the North Adelaide Congregational Church.

Edmund Wright is attributed as the architect of the church  and the foundation stone was laid on 15 May 1860. A tower was added in 1871 and a lecture hall in 1878 designed by architect Thomas Frost. The pipe organ was built in 1881 at which time it was "the largest two manual organ in the colony", and restored in 1914.

James Jefferis was the first pastor, serving from its inception on 20 October 1859, when services were held in the Temperance hall in Tynte Street, North Adelaide, to 1877, then from 1895 to 1901, when he retired.

The church is a landmark and looks over Brougham Gardens in the Adelaide Parklands.

References

Bibliography

External links
 Official Site

Uniting churches in South Australia
Churches in Adelaide
South Australian Heritage Register
North Adelaide
Victorian Free Classical architecture in Australia